Ernst Gaber (6 June 1907 – 13 August 1975) was a German rower who competed in the 1928 Summer Olympics, in the 1932 Summer Olympics, and in the 1936 Summer Olympics.

In 1928 he was part of the German boat which placed fifth after being eliminated in the quarter-finals of the eight event.

Four years later he won the silver medal as member of the German boat in the coxless fours competition. He was also part of the German boat which eliminated in the repechage of the eight event.

In 1936 he won the gold medal as part of the German boat in the coxed four competition.

References

External links 
 profile

1907 births
1975 deaths
Olympic rowers of Germany
Rowers at the 1928 Summer Olympics
Rowers at the 1932 Summer Olympics
Rowers at the 1936 Summer Olympics
Olympic gold medalists for Germany
Olympic silver medalists for Germany
Olympic medalists in rowing
German male rowers
Medalists at the 1936 Summer Olympics
Medalists at the 1932 Summer Olympics
Sportspeople from Mannheim
European Rowing Championships medalists